Erkenek (Erkecel, Erkecey, Ernek, İrkenek, İrkeyel) is a character of Turkish / Turkic folklore. Erkenek is no bigger than a thumb. His adventures mostly include tangling with giants. Erkenek is a traditional folk character. In Azerbaijan folklore besides his name is Cırtdan. In Anatolia also known as Parmak Çocuk (Thumb Child).

The tales
The tales belongs to the swallow cycle. Erkenek is swallowed by a cow or a giant but he is a mighty, although tiny, warrior and conqueror of giants and robbers. He has adventures that again involve swallowing (by a miller), being imprisoned in a mousetrap and finally dying from the poisonous breath of a spider. Erkenek cheats at games with other boys, and, because of his many tricks, the boys will not associate with him.

In other story, a poor childless peasant couple wishes for a child "no matter how small" aloud. Seven months later the wife has a small child "no longer than a thumb" which they call "Erkenek" and who becomes a "wise and nimble creature." Erkenek as he grows wishes to help his father in the chores.

Etymology
In Mongolian language Erhi or Erki (Old Mongol: Erekey) and in Turkish Ernek (Old Turkic: Erŋek) means Thumb.

See also
 Thumbling
 Tom Thumb

References

External links
 Азербайджанская сказка: Как Джиртдан увел детей от страшного дива 

Turkic mythology
Turkish folklore